Karaikudi taluk is a taluk of Sivagangai district of the Indian state of Tamil Nadu. The headquarters of the taluk is the city of Karaikudi

Demographics
According to the 2011 census, the taluk of Karaikudi had a population of 300,811 with 149,602  males and 151,209 females. There were 1011 women for every 1000 men. The taluk had a literacy rate of 77.23. Child population in the age group below 6 was 24,571 Males and 23,983 Females.

References 

Taluks of Sivaganga district